TAP Sports (stylized as tap Sports) is a Philippine pay television network of sports channels owned by TAP Digital Media Ventures Corporation. It was launched on April 14, 2019, under two separate channels carried by Sky Cable, and was later relaunched the following year.

The TAP Sports network has four channels: the main channel itself, and the Premier Sports channels.

History
On April 14, 2019, TAP Sports was launched by TAP DMV on cable provider Sky Cable. Back then, it used to be broadcast on two separate channels covering all live tennis events: TAP Sports 1 (airing the men's ATP tournaments) and TAP Sports 2 (airing the women's WTA tournaments).

On February 17, 2020, the TAP Sports network was relaunched, this time as a general sports channel replacing TAP Sports 1. On the same day, it launched 4 new sister channels: TAP W (women-centric sports; replacing TAP Sports 2), TAP Edge (action/adventure/outdoor sports; including EDGEsport programming), Premier Tennis (ATP and WTA), and Premier Football (soccer).

On September 20, 2021, TAP DMV launched Premier Sports, a complimentary channel of TAP Sports.

Programming

List of sports broadcasting rights
Note: Some sporting rights are sublicensed from DAZN and FITE TV.

Auto racing
IndyCar Series
FIA World Rallycross Championship (WRC)
Formula E
W Series

Badminton
Badminton World Federation

Basketball
EuroLeague
National Basketball League (Australia)
B.League
Maharlika Pilipinas Basketball League (MPBL)
Chinese Basketball Association

Boxing
Golden Boy Promotions
Premier Boxing Champions

Cycling
Tour de Suisse
Union Cycliste Internationale

eSports
Arena eSports
ELEAGUE

Football
2022 FIFA World Cup

Mixed martial arts
Enfusion
Professional Fighters League
ONE Warrior Series Philippines (Airing Sundays on GTV (Philippine TV network)
Bare Knuckle Fighting Championship

Multi Sports
Paralympic Games

Volleyball
Fédération Internationale de Volleyball (FIVB)

Wrestling
Impact Wrestling
Impact!
Impact Wrestling Pay-per-view events
WWE
WWE Raw
WWE SmackDown (starting 2023)
WWE NXT
WWE NXT UK
WWE Main Event
WWE Bottom Line (starting 2023)
WWE Afterburn
This Week in WWE

Other sports
EDGEsport
EDGEsportstories

Non-sports programming
Action Sports World
Badminton Unlimited
BattleBots
Caffeine and Octane
Drive
FIBA Weekly
Jay Leno's Garage
The Mike and Cole Show
MotorClub
OnPoint

References

Sports television networks in the Philippines
English-language television stations in the Philippines
Television channels and stations established in 2019
Sports television in the Philippines
Television networks in the Philippines
2019 establishments in the Philippines
TAP Digital Media Ventures Corporation